The following lists events that happened during 2015 in the Republic of the Union of Myanmar.

Incumbents
 President: Thein Sein 
 First Vice President: Sai Mauk Kham 
 Second Vice President: Nyan Tun

Events

January
 January - An estimated of 1,000 people reported to have been displaced due to the clashes.

February
 February 13 - 2015 Kokang offensive
 In the northeast, 47 soldiers were killed in fighting against Kokang rebels.
 February 14 - 2015 Kokang offensive
 The Burmese government launches airstrikes against the Kokang rebels.
 February 15 - 2015 Kokang offensive
 Around a dozen Kokang rebels by the Myanmar Army and another eight are captured.

March
 March 3 - Myanmar students on a march to Yangon to protest an academic bill defy a police order to disperse in Letpadan Township.
 March 13 -
 China sends fighter jets to the border of Myanmar after an attempted bombing of rebels on Chinese land kills 4 people.
 A ferry sinks off the Burmese coast, leaving 21 dead and 26 missing.

April
 April 19 - 2015 Kokang offensive
 Burmese authorities claim that 126 Burmese soldiers died in clashes with the Myanmar Nationalities Democratic Alliance Army in Kokang since February.

May
 May - 2015 Rohingya refugee crisis
 469 Rohingya from Myanmar on two boats reach western Indonesia have been turned away by the Indonesian Navy. Rohingya and Bangladeshi refugees also arrive in Malaysia but are detained. The Myanmar Navy rescues two boats with 208 migrants during international pressure to make the Rohingya citizens of Burma to end the refugee crisis.
 May 23 - President Thein Sein signs the Population Control Health Care Bill requiring parents to space each child apart by three years.

July
 July 16: 2015 Myanmar floods

August
 August 10: Black Ribbon Movement Myanmar
A movement of medical professions and medical students against the appointment of military officers to positions within Ministry of Health.

November
 November 8: 2015 Myanmar general election
 November 22: 2015 Hpakant jade mine disaster
A major landslide in Hpakant, Kachin State, northern Myanmar killed at least 116 people near a jade mine, with around 100 more missing.

References

 
Myanmar
Years of the 21st century in Myanmar
Myanmar
2010s in Myanmar